Sylvia Kauders (née Wolinsky; December 1, 1921 – May 5, 2016) was an American actress.

Early life and education
Kauders was born Sylvia Wolinsky to Russian immigrants, Morris and Sadie (née Pincus) Wolinsky, in Philadelphia, and grew up in Upper Darby, Pennsylvania. When her father died while she was only ten, Kauders' mother ran a grocery store. Kauders attended Upper Darby High School  and in 1942 graduated from the University of Pennsylvania.

Career
Kauders worked in a variety of roles before committing in her 60s to a career in acting. Following college graduation she worked in radio and television. She produced and moderated the television program Under Billy Penn's Hat. She later accepted a job as special events director with the City of Philadelphia and worked with five different mayors, organizing events and hosting celebrities and dignitaries. Following her public sector work, and her retirement, from the City of Philadelphia, she started her own public relations firm. For her Wednesday Is for Women campaign, which brought more women to work at City Hall, she became the first woman inducted into the Philadelphia Public Relations Association Hall of Fame.

At the age of 57, in 1977, she decided to seriously pursue an acting career and establish herself in New York City.

Her Broadway debut took place in 1982 in Harvey Fierstein's Torch Song Trilogy as Mrs. Beckoff, the role originated by Estelle Getty. With her role in Jewish Repertory Theater's production of Crossing Delancey, she became known as an "entirely lovable Bubbie, (Yiddish For grandmother), a peppery lady whose charm is a mask for a determination to carry out her schemes, " according to New York Times theater critic, Richard F Shepard.

Her film credits include roles in American Splendor; Analyze That (2002); Predator 2 (1990), City Hall (1996). Woody Allen tapped her for two of his films, Crimes and Misdemeanors (1989) and Manhattan Murder Mystery (1993). Also in 1993, Sylvia co-starred, (Small Roll), opposite Michael Keaton, Nicole Kidman, and Michael Constantine, and Bradley Whitford, In “My Life,” (as Keaton's character's Aunt). Her last films were Inside Llewyn Davis (2013) and Love the Coopers (2015).

Kauders appeared in dozens of dozens of television shows, including Law & Order: Special Victims Unit, and in the HBO series The Sopranos, in the final season, as a foul-mouthed old neighborhood lady, who seeks Tony's help with “fixing the neighborhood.”.

Personal life and death
 
Her husband, Randle Morgan Kauders, predeceased her after 48 years of marriage. The couple had no children. She died on May 5, 2016, of a heart attack at the age of 94.

Partial filmography

Witness (1985) - Tourist Lady
Armed and Dangerous (1986) - Older Woman at Party
Sticky Fingers (1988) - Francis
Crimes and Misdemeanors (1989) - Seder Guest
Predator 2 (1990) - Ruth
Age Isn't Everything (1991)
This Is My Life (1992) - Evelyn
Manhattan Murder Mystery (1993) - Neighbor
My Life (1993) - Aunt Tekla
City Hall (1996) - Gussie
XXL (1997) - Secrétaire
Meschugge (1998) - Sarah Singer
Judy Berlin (1999) - Woman on Bench
Love the Hard Way (2001) - Mrs. Rosenberg
Mr. Deeds (2002) - Sue, the Bench Woman
Analyze That (2002) - Aunt Esther
American Splendor (2003) - Old Jewish Lady
Imaginary Heroes (2004) - Hattie
Building Girl (2005) - Mrs. Rochen
The Last New Yorker (2007) - Miriam Weiss
The Wrestler (2008) - Hudson Acres Lady at Deli Counter
The Answer Man (2009) - Old Woman
Today's Special (2009) - Restaurant Patron
According to Greta (2009) - Mrs. Wocheski
Man on a Ledge (2012) - Angry Traffic Woman
The Big Wedding (2013) - Elderly Wife
Peeples (2013) - Mrs. Davis
Inside Llewyn Davis (2013) - Ginny
Love the Coopers (2015) - Sara (final film role)

References

1921 births
2016 deaths
Actresses from Philadelphia
American public relations people
American film actresses
American people of Russian-Jewish descent
American stage actresses
Jewish American actresses
University of Pennsylvania alumni
20th-century American actresses
21st-century American actresses
21st-century American Jews